Pedro Gomes Bortoluzo (born 17 July 1996) is a Brazilian professional footballer who plays as a striker for Portuguesa.

Club career
Born in Florianópolis, Bortoluzo joined the youth setup of São Paulo in 2009. He went on to win 2015 Copa do Brasil Sub-20 and 2016 U-20 Copa Libertadores with the youth side. Ahead of the 2016 season, he was promoted to the senior team.

On 3 July 2016, Bortoluzo made his first team debut, scoring a goal against Ituano in a 2–1 defeat, in Copa Paulista. On 24 July, he made his Série A debut, in a 1–0 defeat against Grêmio.

On 21 March 2017, Bortoluzo was loaned out to Paraná. After featuring rarely, he left the side on 29 June.

On 28 December 2017, Bortoluzo was loaned out to Guarani for the upcoming season. On 13 April, he scored his first goal for the club in a 2–1 defeat against Fortaleza. He rescinded the deal and returned to his parent club on 11 June 2018.

On 24 November 2018, Bortoluzo won the Campeonato Brasileiro de Aspirantes with the under-23 side, and scored a goal in the second leg of the final match against Internacional. On 8 January 2019, he was loaned out to Criciúma.

Bortoluzo signed for Hougang United for the 2022 Singapore Premier League season from Portuguese second division side U.D. Oliveirense. He scored his first goal for the club on his club debut but injured his thigh in Hougang's second game of the season against Tanjong Pagar United and was ruled out for a few weeks. He had a slow start after that but burst into life during Hougang's AFC Cup campaign in June where he netted four times in three games. He continued his fine form where he scored four times in six league matches.

On 3 January 2023, Bortoluzo was announced at Portuguesa.

Career statistics

Honours
Hougang United
Singapore Cup: 2022

References

External links

1996 births
Living people
Sportspeople from Florianópolis
Brazilian footballers
Association football forwards
Campeonato Brasileiro Série A players
Campeonato Brasileiro Série B players
Liga Portugal 2 players
Singapore Premier League players
São Paulo FC players
Paraná Clube players
Guarani FC players
Criciúma Esporte Clube players
Clube Atlético Votuporanguense players
U.D. Oliveirense players
Hougang United FC players
Associação Portuguesa de Desportos players
Brazilian expatriate footballers
Brazilian expatriate sportspeople in Portugal
Brazilian expatriate sportspeople in Singapore
Expatriate footballers in Portugal
Expatriate footballers in Singapore